The Treaty of London or London Convention or similar may refer to: 

Treaty of London (1358), established a truce between England and France following the Battle of Poitiers
Treaty of London (1359), which ceded western France to England
Treaty of London (1474), an alliance between England and Burgundy against France
Treaty of London (1518), a non-aggression pact between Burgundy, France, England, the Holy Roman Empire, the Netherlands, the Papal States and Spain
Treaty of London (1604), a conclusion of the Anglo-Spanish War
Treaty of London (1641), between England and Scotland
Treaty of London (1700), also known as the Second Partition Treaty
Convention of London (1786), which allowed British settlers in Belize to cut and export timber
Convention of London (1814), or the Anglo-Dutch Treaty of 1814, which returned some colonies to the Netherlands
Treaty of 1818 or London Convention of 1818, between the United States of America and the United Kingdom
Treaty of London (1824) or Anglo-Dutch Treaty of 1824, which resolved disputes from the 1814 treaty
Treaty of London (1827), an alliance between Britain, France, and Russia, for the end of Ottoman action in Greece
Treaty of London (1832), which followed the London Conference of 1832, between Britain, France and Russia, creating an independent Kingdom of Greece
Treaty of London (1839), which recognised the independence and neutrality of Belgium
Convention of London (1840), which granted Muhammad Ali Pasha hereditary control over Egypt
London Straits Convention (1841), which closed the Bosporus and the Dardanelles to warships
Convention of London (1861), between Britain, France and Spain, which agreed upon a course of action towards obtaining loan repayments from Mexico
Treaty of London (1864), which united the Ionian Islands with Greece
Treaty of London (1867), which guaranteed the neutrality of Luxembourg
Treaty of London (1871), between Prussia, Austria, Turkey, Britain and Italy, which reversed the neutralization of the Black Sea
London Convention (1884), between the United Kingdom and the South African Republic
Treaty of London (1890), between the United Kingdom, the Kingdom of Germany and the Kingdom of Portugal, over territorial claims in Southern Africa
Convention for the Preservation of Wild Animals, Birds and Fish in Africa (1900)
Treaty of London (1913), which ended the First Balkan War
Treaty of London (1915), between the Entente powers and the Kingdom of Italy
London Naval Treaty (1930), which established limits on naval fleets and construction programmes
Convention Relative to the Preservation of Fauna and Flora in their Natural State (1933)
London Convention on the Definition of Aggression (1933)
Second London Naval Treaty (1936), which furthered naval arms control limits
Anglo-Soviet Treaty, signed in London on 26 May 1942
London Protocol (1944), agreement between the Allies of World War II on dividing Germany into three occupation zones after the war
Treaty of London (1945), the legal basis for the Nazi trials
Treaty of London (1946), which ended the British mandate over Transjordan
Treaty of London (1949), which created the Council of Europe
Treaty of London (1956), which promised independence to British Malaya
London Convention on the Prevention of Marine Pollution by Dumping of Wastes and Other Matter (1972)

See also 
 Anglo-Dutch Treaty (disambiguation)
 Anglo-Irish Treaty (1921), which established a semi-independent Irish Free State
 Jay Treaty (1794), between Britain and the US, to resolve various issues arising from the 1776 American Revolution
 London Agreement (disambiguation)
 London Declaration (disambiguation)
 London Protocol (disambiguation)
 List of conferences in London
 List of treaties

Lists of treaties
London-related lists